Durham or County Durham was a county constituency in northern England, which elected two Members of Parliament (MPs) to the House of Commons from 1675 until 1832.

History 
The constituency consisted of the whole county of Durham (including the enclaves of Norhamshire, Islandshire and Bedlington, all situated within the boundaries of Northumberland and now part of that county, and of Crayke, now in North Yorkshire).

Because of its semi-autonomous status as a county palatine, Durham had not been represented in Parliament during the medieval period; by the 17th century it was the only part of England which elected no MPs. In 1621, Parliament passed a bill to enfranchise the county, but James I refused it the royal assent, as he considered that the House of Commons already had too many members and that some decayed boroughs should be abolished first; a similar bill in 1624 failed to pass the House of Lords. During the Commonwealth, County Durham was allowed to send members to the First and Second Parliaments of the Protectorate, though the privilege was not maintained when Parliament reverted to its earlier electoral arrangements from 1658. After the Restoration, Durham's right to return MPs was recognised in 1661, and finally confirmed by an Act of Parliament which was passed in 1673; however, it did not come into effect until 1675 when the Speaker was authorised to issue his warrant. The county returned two members, and the same Act also established Durham City as a parliamentary borough with its own two members.

As in other county constituencies the franchise between 1430 and 1832 was defined by the Forty Shilling Freeholder Act, which gave the right to vote to every man who possessed freehold property within the county valued at £2 or more per year for the purposes of land tax; it was not necessary for the freeholder to occupy his land, nor even in later years to be resident in the county at all.

By the time of the Reform Act, the county had a population of just over 250,000, although this was slightly reduced by the boundary changes which severed the enclaves and made them part of Northumberland or the North Riding of Yorkshire for parliamentary purposes. The electorate was only a fraction of this number: at the general election of 1790, 5,578 voted, and in 1820 the number was only 3,741. Although nobody could exert the degree of control over the voters that was common in many boroughs, several of the major local landowners had significant influence, in particular the Vane Earls of Darlington.

In 1832 the county's representation was doubled, and the constituency divided into two new two-member constituencies, North Durham and South Durham.

Members of Parliament 

Notes

Election results

See also

 History of parliamentary constituencies and boundaries in Durham

References
 Robert Beatson, A Chronological Register of Both Houses of Parliament (London: Longman, Hurst, Res & Orme, 1807) 
 T. H. B. Oldfield The Representative History of Great Britain and Ireland (London: Baldwin, Cradock & Joy, 1816)
 J Holladay Philbin, Parliamentary Representation 1832 - England and Wales (New Haven: Yale University Press, 1965)
 Edward Porritt and Annie G Porritt, The Unreformed House of Commons (Cambridge University Press, 1903)

Parliamentary constituencies in County Durham (historic)
Constituencies of the Parliament of the United Kingdom established in 1675
1675 establishments in England
Constituencies of the Parliament of the United Kingdom disestablished in 1832